East Jaintia Hills district is a district with its headquarters at Khliehriat in Meghalaya state of India. The district was carved out of Jaintia Hills district on 31 July 2012.

Khliehriat and Saipung are the two community and rural development blocks of the district.

History
East Jaintia Hills District was carved out of the erstwhile Jaintia Hills District on 31 July 2012. Khliehriat, the district headquarters, was created as an administrative unit on August 14, 1976 and was upgraded to a civil sub division on May 27, 1982 before finally becoming the district headquarters.

Geography
The district comprises 2 community and rural development blocks viz. Khliehriat C&RD Block, and Saipung C&RD Block with the following boundaries:

 North - Assam and West Jaintia Hills District
 South - Bangladesh and Assam
 East - Assam
 West - West Jaintia Hills District

Divisions
East Jaintia Hills district is divided into two blocks, namely:

Demographics

Mainly inhabited by the Pnar (also known as Jaintia), Khynriam and the Biates, East Jaintia Hills has a population of 1,22,939. Scheduled Tribes make up 118,158 (96.11%) of the population.

At the time of the 2011 census, 81.39% of the population spoke Pnar, 9.04% Biate, 6.30% Khasi and 3.16% War as their first language.

References

External links 
 Official website

 
Districts of Meghalaya
Autonomous regions of India
2012 establishments in Meghalaya